The Mubarak Begum Mosque also known as Randi ki Masjid (Prostitute's Mosque) is a 19th-century historical red sandstone mosque belonging to the Mughal Empire located in  Hauz Qazi, Shahjahanabad, Delhi,  the Chawri Bazaar metro station in India. The mosque is also referred to as courtesan's mosque. On 19 July 2020, the central dome of the mosque collapsed due to heavy rainfall. It was reported that only a part of the dome was crashed down around 6:45 am. Currently the mosque is under the custody of Delhi Wakf Board.

History 
The mosque was built in the early decades of the 19th century in 1823 by a nautch girl called Mubarak Begum who also served as a courtesan in the Mughal court. The mosque was built during the Mughal era. 

She was born into a poor Muslim family initially pursued her career as a dancing girl in Pune. Begum was also married to David Ochterlony (with whom she had two daughters), who was a two time British resident to Mughal emperor's court in Delhi in 1802 and in 1822. After the death of Mubarak Begum in 1878, the control of the mosque was taken over by the British government. It is one of the three mosques to be constructed by women in medieval India. Some sources state the mosque was built by the David Ochterlony in memory of Mubarak Begum.

Structure 
The mosque is built up of red sandstone and lakhori bricks as a two-storey structure. The upper floor consists of prayer chamber containing three domed compartments. It also comprises three red and white striped domes and three arched entrances under each dome. It was reported that the mosque was last repaired and maintained in 2016.

References 

19th-century mosques
Sandstone buildings
Mosques in Delhi
Religious buildings and structures completed in 1823